Persatuan Sepakbola Indonesia Pati, commonly known as Persipa Pati, Persipa, is an  Indonesian football club based in Pati, Central Java. The club plays in Liga 2.

History
Persipa Pati was established in the early days of independence in 1951, Laskar Saridin and Kebo Landoh is a nicknames for them. Saridin is an important figure who is respected by the people of Pati. While the Kebo Landoh is Saridin's pet Buffalo whose skin cannot be penetrated by any weapon, their highest achievement is competing in the Liga Indonesia Premier Division. This is what Patifosi is longing for at the moment. In one match when Persipa was competing, a banner read "Bapak…!Rasane Divisi Utama Niku Pripun".

In the 2016 Liga Nusantara Central Java zone, Persipa Pati managed to advance to the semifinals, before finally being defeated by Persikaba Blora with a 1-0 aggregate at the Krisdosono Stadium.

On 2 November 2021, Persipa Pati made their 2021 Liga 3 Central Java match debut in a 0–0 draw against Persip Pekalongan at the Hoegeng Stadium, they actually played aggressively, and even tended to dominate the match led by referee Fero Arisanto from Kendal.

Players

Current squad

Coaching Staff

Honours
 Liga 3 Central Java
 Champion: 2021

References

External links
 

Association football clubs established in 1951
1951 establishments in Indonesia
Football clubs in Central Java
Football clubs in Indonesia